The Hyundai Team Matches were a series of golf tournaments from 1994 to 2002. The matches features four two-player teams from the LPGA Tour, the PGA Tour, and the Senior PGA Tour (now the Champions Tour). Within each tour, the teams competed in a match play format. It was played at three different locations in California. The event was known as the Diners Club Matches from 1994 to 1999.

Tournament locations
1994–1997: PGA West Jack Nicklaus Resort Course, La Quinta, California
1999–2000: Pelican Hill, Newport Beach, California
2001–2002: Monarch Beach Golf Links, Dana Point, California

Winners

References

Former LPGA Tour events
Golf in California
Recurring sporting events established in 1994
Recurring sporting events disestablished in 2002
Women's sports in California